Prague Winter: A Personal Story of Remembrance and War, 1937–1948 is an autobiographical book written by Madeleine Albright. The book was first published on 24 April 2012.

Synopsis 
This is Albright's autobiographical book. She was born in Prague, Czechoslovakia, in 1937. In this book she has narrated her childhood memories and experiences. Before she became 12 years old, she witnessed the Nazi invasion in Prague.

Reviews 
Los Angeles Times wrote in their review—
For American readers who may not be familiar with the legacy of Thomas and Jan Masaryk, this book provides enough sweeping history and close-up detail so that Jan's end, after the war, comes as a shock.

References

External links 
 Book details at GoodReads
 After Words interview with Albright on Prague Winter, June 9, 2012, C-SPAN 

2012 non-fiction books
Political autobiographies
Books by Madeleine Albright
Books about Czechoslovakia
HarperCollins books